Tommy Hicks (born June 27, 1944) is an American former light heavyweight boxer.

Early life 
Hicks was born in Lockport, New York.  He attended Ithaca College.

Career
Hicks won the Buffalo Golden Gloves tournament in 1965 in the 175 Novice Division, and in 1967 won the Open 175 Division and finished third in the Nationals in Milwaukee.

Hicks began boxing professionally part-time in 1967, while continuing to work as a teacher.  Fighting from 1967 to 1974, he won 18 fights, 10 by knockout, while losing 12, 8 by knockout, and drawing 3. On October 30 1971 Hicks challenged Bob Foster (boxer) for the World Boxing Council Light Heavyweight title at Scranton Pennsylvania. Hicks was stopped in the 8th round. 

He was inducted into the Buffalo Boxing Hall of Fame.

References

1944 births
People from Lockport, New York
Light-heavyweight boxers

Ithaca College alumni
Living people
American male boxers